Trionyx kansaiensis is an extinct species of softshell turtle uncovered from the Late Cretaceous of Tajikistan and Qyzylorda, Kazakhstan.

References

K
Late Cretaceous turtles of Asia
Extinct turtles